The Panzhou–Xingyi high-speed railway is a high-speed railway line currently under construction in China. It is expected to be completed in 2024.

The northern terminus of the line is Panzhou railway station and the southern terminus is Xingyi South. There is one intermediate station, Baotian.

References

High-speed railway lines in China